Vaden is both a given name and a surname. Notable people with the name include:

 Vaden Todd Lewis (born 1965), American singer
 Paul Vaden (born 1967), American boxer
 Robert C. Vaden (1882–1954), American businessman and state senator
 Robert Vaden (basketball) (born 1985), American basketball player